James S. Halpern (born 1945) is an American lawyer who serves as a senior judge of the United States Tax Court.

Halpern attended Hackley School in Tarrytown, New York until 1963 and earned a B.S. at the [[Wharton School of the University of Pennsylvania in 1967. He received a Juris Doctor from the University of Pennsylvania Law School in 1972, followed by a Master of Laws in taxation from New York University Law School in 1975, earned while he worked as an associate in the law firm of Mudge, Rose, Guthrie and Alexander in New York City.

He taught law at Washington and Lee University and St. John's University, and New York University until 1979, then briefly returned to private practice with Roberts and Holland in New York City before joining the legal staff of the Internal Revenue Service from 1980 to 1983.

He was a partner with Baker Hostetler in Washington, D.C. from 1983 to 1990, while also teaching on a limited basis at George Washington University.

Halpern was appointed by President George H. W. Bush as Judge, United States Tax Court, on July 3, 1990, for a term ending July 2, 2005, and re-appointed by George W. Bush on November 2, 2005, for a term ending November 1, 2020. He retired on October 16, 2015, but continues to perform judicial duties as senior judge on recall.

Halpern is married to former Consumer Product Safety Commission acting Chairwoman, Nancy Nord. He has a son and daughter.

Other
Colonel, U.S. Army Reserve (retired).

Notes

1945 births
Living people
20th-century American judges
21st-century American judges
George Washington University faculty
Judges of the United States Tax Court
New York University School of Law alumni
People associated with BakerHostetler
St. John's University (New York City) faculty
United States Article I federal judges appointed by George H. W. Bush
United States Article I federal judges appointed by George W. Bush
University of Pennsylvania Law School alumni
Wharton School of the University of Pennsylvania alumni
Washington and Lee University faculty